Yuktibhāṣā, also known as Gaṇita-yukti-bhāṣā and  (Compendium of Astronomical Rationale), is a major treatise on mathematics and astronomy, written by the Indian astronomer Jyesthadeva of the Kerala school of mathematics around 1530. The treatise, written in Malayalam, is a consolidation of the discoveries by Madhava of Sangamagrama, Nilakantha Somayaji, Parameshvara, Jyeshtadeva, Achyuta Pisharati, and other astronomer-mathematicians of the Kerala school. It also exists in a Sanskrit version, with unclear author and date, composed as a rough translation of the Malayalam original.

The work contains proofs and derivations of the theorems that it presents. Modern historians used to assert, based on the works of Indian mathematics that first became available, that early Indian scholars in astronomy and computation lacked in proofs, but  demonstrates otherwise.

Some of its important topics include the infinite series expansions of functions; power series, including of π and π/4; trigonometric series of sine, cosine, and arctangent; Taylor series, including second and third order approximations of sine and cosine; radii, diameters and circumferences; and tests of convergence.

 mainly gives rationale for the results in Nilakantha's Tantra Samgraha. It is considered an early text on the ideas of calculus, predating Newton and Leibniz by centuries. The treatise was largely unnoticed outside India, as it was written in the local language of Malayalam. In modern times, due to wider international cooperation in mathematics, the wider world has taken notice of the work. For example, both Oxford University and the Royal Society of Great Britain have given attribution to pioneering mathematical theorems of Indian origin that predate their Western counterparts.

Contents
 contains most of the developments of the earlier Kerala school, particularly Madhava and Nilakantha. The text is divided into two parts – the former deals with mathematical analysis and the latter with astronomy. Beyond this, the continuous text does not have any further division into subjects or topics, so published editions divide the work into chapters based on editorial judgment.

Mathematics

This subjects treated in the mathematics part of the  can be divided into seven chapters:

 parikarma: logistics (the eight mathematical operations)
 daśapraśna: ten problems involving logistics
 bhinnagaṇita: arithmetic of fractions
 trairāśika: rule of three
 kuṭṭakāra: pulverisation (linear indeterminate equations)
 paridhi-vyāsa: relation between circumference and diameter: infinite series and approximations for the ratio of the circumference and diameter of a circle
 jyānayana: derivation of Rsines: infinite series and approximations for sines.

The first four chapters of the  contain elementary mathematics, such as division, the Pythagorean theorem, square roots, etc. Novel ideas are not discussed until the sixth chapter on circumference of a circle.  contains a derivation and proof for the power series of inverse tangent, discovered by Madhava. In the text, Jyesthadeva describes Madhava's series in the following manner:

In modern mathematical notation,

or, expressed in terms of tangents,

which in Europe was conventionally called Gregory's series after James Gregory, who rediscovered it in 1671.

The text also contains Madhava's infinite series expansion of π which he obtained from the expansion of the arc-tangent function.

which in Europe was conventionally called Leibniz's series, after Gottfried Leibniz who rediscovered it in 1673.

Using a rational approximation of this series, he gave values of the number π as 3.14159265359, correct to 11 decimals, and as 3.1415926535898, correct to 13 decimals.

The text describes two methods for computing the value of π. First, obtain a rapidly converging series by transforming the original infinite series of π. By doing so, the first 21 terms of the infinite series

was used to compute the approximation to 11 decimal places. The other method was to add a remainder term to the original series of π.

Apart from these, the  contains many elementary and complex mathematical topics, including,

 Proofs for the expansion of the sine and cosine functions
The sum and difference formulae for sine and cosine
 Integer solutions of systems of linear equations (solved using a system known as kuttakaram)
 Geometric derivations of series
 Early statements of Taylor series for some functions
 Tests of convergence for sums .
.

Astronomy
Chapters eight to seventeen deal with subjects of astronomy: planetary orbits, celestial spheres, ascension, declination, directions and shadows, spherical triangles, ellipses, and parallax correction. The planetary theory described in the book is similar to that later adopted by Danish astronomer Tycho Brahe.
The topics covered in the eight chapters are computation of mean and true longitudes of planets, Earth and celestial spheres, fifteen problems relating to ascension, declination, longitude, etc.,  determination of time, place, direction, etc., from gnomonic shadow, eclipses, Vyatipata (when the sun and moon have the same declination), visibility correction for planets  and phases of the moon.

Specifically,

grahagati: planetary motion, bhagola: sphere of the zodiac, madhyagraha: mean planets, sūryasphuṭa: true sun, grahasphuṭa: true planets
bhū-vāyu-bhagola: spheres of the earth, atmosphere, and asterisms, ayanacalana: precession of the equinoxes
pañcadaśa-praśna: fifteen problems relating to spherical triangles
dig-jñāna: orientation, chāyā-gaṇita: shadow computations, lagna: rising point of the ecliptic, nati-lambana: parallaxes of latitude and longitude
grahaṇa: eclipse
vyatīpāta
visibility correction of planets
moon's cusps and phases of the moon

Modern editions

The mathematics part of the text, along with notes in Malayalam, was first published in 1948 by Rama Varma Thampuran and Akhileswara Aiyar.

The first critical edition of the entire Malayalam text, alongside an English translation and detailed explanatory notes, was published in two volumes by Springer in 2008. A third volume, containing a critical edition of the Sanskrit Ganitayuktibhasa, was published by the Indian Institute of Advanced Study, Shimla in 2009.

This edition of Yuktibhasa has been divided into two volumes: Volume I deals with  mathematics and Volume II treats astronomy. Each volume is divided into three parts: First part is an English translation of the relevant Malayalam part of Yuktibhasa, second part contains  detailed explanatory notes on the translation,  and in the third part the text in the Malayalam original is reproduced. The English translation is by K.V. Sarma and the explanatory notes are provided by K. Ramasubramanian,  M. D. Srinivas, and M. S. Sriram.

An open access edition of Yuktibhasa is published by Sayahna Foundation in 2020.

See also
 Ganita-yukti-bhasa
 Madhava's correction term
 Indian mathematics
 Kerala School

References

External links
 Biography of Jyesthadeva – School of Mathematics and Statistics University of St Andrews, Scotland

Astronomy books
Indian mathematics
Hindu astronomy
Hindu astrological texts
History of mathematics
Kerala school of astronomy and mathematics
Mathematics manuscripts
Indian astronomy texts